Kuntur Tuqlla (Quechua kuntur condor, tuqlla trap, "condor trap", also spelled Condortojlla) is a mountain in the Bolivian Andes which reaches a height of approximately . It is located in the Potosí Department, on the border of the Antonio Quijarro Province, Porco Municipality, and the José María Linares Province, Caiza "D" Municipality. Kuntur Tuqlla lies north of Qanchis Kancha, west of the village of Libruni. The Uqururu Mayu flows along its slopes.

References 

Mountains of Potosí Department